The Halton Hills Bulldogs are Junior "B" box lacrosse team from Georgetown, Ontario, Canada.  The Bulldogs play in the OLA Junior B Lacrosse League.

History
The Bulldogs joined the OLA-B in 1995.  Despite the 1999-2000 name change, the team has always played out of Georgetown.

The Bulldogs first four seasons were mediocre at best and their fifth season was horrible.  The 1999 season (0-21-0), although terrible served as a catalyst for turning Halton into a winning lacrosse team.

The 2000 season turned out to be an excellent turnaround for the team.  Changing their name during the wintertime, the Bulldogs went from no wins in 1999 to an 8-12-0 record.  They failed to make the playoffs that year, but did qualify for the "Tier II" Championship—and won.  Since winning the Tier II title, Halton has not had a losing season.  The only unfortunate point is that the Bulldogs, despite having some regular season success, have yet to do very well in the playoffs.  In six straight playoff berths, the Bulldogs have yet to get past the quarter-finals.  Another highpoint in their recent history is that for the past six seasons, the team's goals for have surpassed the number of goals against.  Once again though, making the playoffs is one thing, having success in them is another.

In 2002, the Bulldogs were awarded the right to host the prestigious Founders Cup Tournament.  This gave the Bulldogs an automatic berth in the national tourney.  In pool play the Bulldogs came second to the Ontario Champs from Spartan.  This put them in the semi-finals against the Clarington Green Gaels. The Bulldogs, despite a huge effort from everyone involved could not pull out the victory as the Gaels came from behind to win 7–5 in overtime.  While the Gaels went on to win the tournament, the Bulldogs were forced to play in the bronze medal game against Edmonton.  In the end it was not meant to be as the Miners defeated the Bulldogs 9–7 in overtime.

In 2010, the Bulldogs won the Founders Cup, defeating the host Mimico Mountaineers 4–3 in double overtime.

Season-by-season results
Note: GP = Games played, W = Wins, L = Losses, T = Ties, Pts = Points, GF = Goals for, GA = Goals against

Founders Cup
CANADIAN NATIONAL CHAMPIONSHIPS

External links
Bulldogs Webpage
The Bible of Lacrosse
Unofficial OLA Page

Ontario Lacrosse Association teams
Halton Hills